Abezhdan-e Malmulil (also Romanized as Ābezhdān-e Malmūlīl; also known as Ābezhdān-e Malmūlīn) is a village in Abezhdan Rural District, Abezhdan District, Andika County, Khuzestan Province, Iran. At the 2006 census, its population was 177, in 34 families.

References 

Populated places in Andika County